The Louisville White Sox were a Negro league baseball team in the Western Independent Clubs in 1914 and 1915, based in Louisville, Kentucky. They played their home games at Spring Bank Park in 1914 and 1915 and at Eclipse Park in 1915.

They were of no connection to the later Louisville White Sox of the Negro National League.

References

Defunct baseball teams in Kentucky
Negro league baseball teams
Baseball teams established in 1914
Baseball teams disestablished in 1915
1914 establishments in Kentucky
1915 disestablishments in Kentucky
Professional baseball teams in Kentucky